Alpha Xi Delta (often referred to as A-"Zee"-D ) is a women's fraternity founded on April 17, 1893 at Lombard College in Galesburg, Illinois, United States.

Alpha Xi Delta is a member of National Panhellenic Conference (NPC), the umbrella organization of 26 national sororities.  The sorority has over 162,000 initiated members and maintains active chapters at 129 institutions across the United States.

Early History 

In 1893, ten young women at Lombard College in Galesburg, Illinois founded Alpha Xi Delta. They ranged in age from 16 to 26.

  Cora Bollinger Block (1869–1944) was the first President of Alpha Xi Delta. She went on to be the first Grand President, and a community leader in Davenport, Iowa.
  Alice Bartlett Bruner (1878–1966) was an organist who taught music at the Lombard Conservatory. She had two daughters who later joined the sorority.
  Bertha Cook Evans (1874–1957) had three daughters, two of whom joined Alpha Xi Delta. Later in her life, she served as a fraternity house director.
  Harriett Luella McCollum  (1874–1948) left Lombard College soon after the founding of the fraternity, due to poor health. She was a feminist who had a long career as a lecturer and author on the psychological causes of crime, and who campaigned for the abolition of capital punishment.
  Lucy W. Gilmer (1872–1939) was the first Vice President of Alpha Xi Delta. She studied to be a nurse.
  Lewie Strong Taylor (1867–1950) designed the quill symbol. She became a teacher and homemaker in Salt Lake City, Utah.
  Almira Lowry Cheney (1875–1946) was a teacher who went on to pioneer religious education by becoming a minister of the Universalist Church. She was also Chaplain of the 12th, 13th, and 14th National Conventions for Alpha Xi Delta.
  Frances Elizabeth Cheney (1869–1901), in her time as an Alpha Xi, served as chaplain, secretary, and president. She is given credit for many of the fraternity's early songs. She served as a Unitarian pastor before her death at the age of 32.
  Eliza Drake Curtis Everton (1867–1934) was a widow when she attended Lombard's Ryder Divinity School. She became a Universalist minister.
  Julia Maude Foster (1875–1948) was a member of the committee who drafted Alpha Xi Delta's first constitution. She spent her professional career as a teacher of young children.

In 1904, the sorority joined the National Panhellenic Conference. Alpha Xi Delta's Ella Boston Leib was NPC Chair in 1906. Lena Grandin Baldwin, an Alpha Xi Delta who served as NPC Chairman from 1912-1915, wrote the Panhellenic Creed.

Alpha Xi Delta was referred to as a sorority until 1913, when the term "women's fraternity" was adopted.

Symbols 

The colors of Alpha Xi Delta are double blue (light and dark) and gold. The fraternity flower is the pink rose, as chosen by the founders to complement the white rose of Sigma Nu fraternity, whose brothers helped to found Alpha Xi Delta at Lombard College.

Alpha Xi Delta's badge is the shape of a quill, with the fraternity's Greek letters on the barbs of the feathers. It may only be worn by initiated members in good standing. The quill represents the open motto "The Pen is Mightier than the Sword." A variety of designs were produced in the early years of the fraternity; a standard design was devised by 1911.

The Coat of Arms (crest) is described as: "... a shield supported by two griffins. In the golden band across the center of the shield is the Quill. Three conventional roses are at the top of the shield, and a broken sword is in the lower portion of the shield. Above the shield on the knight's helmet is a twist of ribbon in alternating blue and gold, and a blossomed rose."

BetXi Bear has been the fraternity's official mascot since 1989.

Symphony 

Alpha Xi Delta's open creed is called "The Symphony of Alpha Xi Delta", and it lists the ideals of the fraternity's members:"These things do we earnestly desire: A clear vision of life, that with gracious and kindly hearts we may share both joy and sorrow and bring into living reality the Sisterhood of women. An appreciation of real merit and worth, steadfastness of soul, that without bitterness or defeat we may encounter misfortune and with humility meet success. These things, O Lord, help us to instill within our hearts that we may grow in courage and graciousness and peace."It was written in 1924 by Helen Willis Lynn, Alice Matthews, and Almira Cheney, one of the founders.

Philanthropy 

Alpha Xi Delta has supported a variety of philanthropies over its history. In 2022, building on the success of the Kindly Hearts Campaign of 2021 (support for those affected by the Covid-19 pandemic) Alpha Xi Delta announced its new national philanthropy: the Kindly Hearts Initiative (support for children experiencing foster care or homelessness.) From 2009 to 2021, its national philanthropic partner was Autism Speaks. The sorority raised more than $12 million for Autism Speaks.

The AmaXIng Challenge 
Each college chapter participates annually in one of six events called "The AmaXing Challenge: Step It Up; Xi Man/Xi Woman; Sports FrenXi; Xi Games; Xi Karaoke; or AmaXing Gala. Funds that are raised support the Kindly Hearts Initiative.

Letters of Love 
In November of each year, collegiate and alumnae members participate in an online and letter-writing project to raise funds and awareness effort. Letters of Love supports two "key impact" organizations: FosterClub and StandUp for Kids.

Membership

Eligibility 
"Alpha Xi Delta Fraternity is a private women’s membership organization for individuals who live and self-identify as women. Members are selected following a series of one or more meetings, social events and/or interviews by existing Fraternity members (which may include National Fraternity representatives and/or National Council designees). Each woman selected for membership in Alpha Xi Delta must demonstrate academic achievement, be of good character, have a desire to contribute to the Fraternity’s mission and vision, and be able to contribute to the overall prestige of Alpha Xi Delta. In addition, she must be neither a pledged member nor a past or present initiated member of any other National Panhellenic Conference fraternity, or any similar single –gender national college or university fraternity, with the exception of honorary and professional organizations."

Chapters

Notable alumnae 
Entertainment

Audrey Banach (Alpha Kappa) – Miss Kansas USA 2013
Megan Blake (Gamma Eta) – actress, The Young and the Restless, The Opposite Sex, It Takes Two; Miss Georgia 1983
Chrissie Fit (Theta Xi) – actress, Pitch Perfect 2, Pitch Perfect 3
Nichole Greene (Gamma Beta) – Miss West Virginia USA, 2016
Jane Henson (Beta Eta) – co-founder of the Muppets with her husband, Jim Henson
Gail Kobe (Alpha Xi) – actress, The 10 Commandments, Gunsmoke, Bewitched, The Outer Limits, The Twilight Zone; executive producer of Guiding Light
Carol Lawrence (Alpha Theta) – actress, singer, and dancer
Alyssa Murray (Theta Gamma) – Miss Delaware 2012
Pamela Paugh (Gamma Beta) – Miss West Virginia 1980
Amanda Pennekamp (Epsilon Iota) – Miss South Carolina USA 2004; Miss Earth USA 2006
Patsy Ramsey (Iota) – Miss West Virginia 1977; mother of Jonbenet Ramsey
Laurie Lea Schaefer (Pi) – actress; Miss America 1972
Jen Schefft (Pi) – reality TV contestant on The Bachelor and The Bachelorette
Rebecca Yeh (Gamma Tau) – Miss Minnesota 2013
Ava Garcia (Tau) - Actress, Social Influencer, and Philanthropist
Savannah Palacio (Delta Rho) - The Circle Season 2, Beauty Pageant-Miss California Collegiate America Winner, and Social Influencer.

Business

Verna Kay Gibson (Gamma Beta) – first female CEO of a Fortune 500 company (The Limited stores)
Betsey Johnson (Eta) – fashion designer
Kelley Earnhardt Miller (Zeta Chi) – Vice President and General Manager of JR Motorsports
Carolyn Rafaelian (Beta Upsilon) – founder of Alex and Ani bracelets
Karen Marie Shelton (Epsilon Xi) – Internet (Hairboutique.com) and telephony (T&S software) entrepreneur
Sarah Bratton (Zeta Xi) – Auburn University

Writers

Carol Aebersold (Gamma Chi) – co-author of The Elf on the Shelf
Karen Tumulty (Beta Alpha) – national political correspondent for Time magazine and The Washington Post
Emily Beck (Iota Chi) - co-author of "Milk and Vine"
Government and military

Anne Clarke (politician) American-born British Labour Party London Assembly member.
Jan Davis (Gamma Eta) – NASA astronaut
Janet Christine Dietrich - American pilot and one of the Mercury 13 who underwent the same NASA testing in the early 1960s as the Mercury 7 astronauts.
Mimi Blackburn Drew (Nu) – first female Rear Admiral, United States Navy
Deborah Pryce (Psi) – politician, U.S. Representative from Ohio
Major General Polly A. Peyer - Retired major general in the U.S. Air Force. She previously commanded the Warner Robins Air Logistics Center at Robins AFB in Warner Robins, Georgia.
Susan Winckler (Sigma) – former Acting Chief of Staff of the Food and Drug Administration
Ella Lillian Wall Van Leer (Gamma Eta) –  artist and architect, women's rights activist

Responding to Change and Challenges

Women at Georgia Tech 
After several failed attempts, women were admitted for the first time in Georgia Tech in the 1950s. To help support the first women on campus, women's advocate and Alpha Xi Delta alumna Ella Wall Van Leer helped establish a chapter of Alpha Xi Delta on the Georgia Tech campus.

Ending racial barriers 
An event from the waning days of World War II showcases the intensity whereby collegiate members were beginning to break from cultural norms that were common until those decades of change.  Few Black students attended the University of Vermont by mid-Century - there were only two enrolled in 1943. Many of the student body, including the majority of members of the ΑΞΔ chapter on the campus had agitated in 1945-46 for a removal of racial and religious quotas that had limited enrollment for decades.

In October 1945, Crystal Malone, one of the few Black students, was a junior on the Burlington campus of the University of Vermont. The Upsilon chapter of Alpha Xi Delta offered her membership. Although the fraternity constitution did not have explicit racial restrictions, the National Council ordered the local chapter to withdraw their offer. They refused. The National President, Winnafred Corwin Robinson (Mrs. Beverly Robinson) ordered the chapter closed.

Today, the fraternity's constitution and bylaws state: "Alpha Xi Delta Fraternity believes it is inherent in our principles not to discriminate on the basis of religion, race, national origin, disability, sexual orientation, veteran status, citizenship, or age."

Crystal Malone later married the first Black graduate of the Naval Academy, Wesley A. Brown. She had a long career as a teacher and community leader.

Local chapter misconduct 
The official policy of the National Fraternity is that: "All initiated members of Alpha Xi Delta, are responsible for upholding the values and principles of the Fraternity at all times." Local chapters also are required to abide by the policies of their college and of NPC. Chapters that violate health, safety and other policies are subject to disciplinary action from National Council. Some examples are:

 In 2010, the Miami University chapter of Alpha Xi Delta was suspended until 2014 for alcohol violations stemming from their destructive formal at Cincinnati's National Underground Railroad Freedom Center. In 2019, the sorority recolonized and no longer recognizes the members of the class involved in the incident.
 In 2011, the Alpha Xi Delta national organization revoked the Binghamton University chapter's charter for "continu[ing] to violate Alpha Xi Delta's policies on risk management and observance of Fraternity rituals despite efforts to lead the chapter to a culture consistent with Alpha Xi Delta's policies and value."
 In 2017, the Cornell University chapter of Alpha Xi Delta was placed on probationary status for three years, "as a result of incidents determined to include both hazing and alcohol policy violations."
 In 2017, the University of Central Florida chapter of Alpha Xi Delta was suspended on the grounds of "allegations of alcohol-related misconduct, which includes providing alcohol to someone underage; hazing; and possessing and/or providing false and misleading information and/or falsification of university records."

See also 
List of social fraternities and sororities

References

External links 
Alpha Xi Delta
The Quill of Alpha Xi Delta

 
Student organizations established in 1893
Student societies in the United States
National Panhellenic Conference
Fraternities and sororities based in Indianapolis
1893 establishments in Illinois